COD United Amazons F.C., (also called COD United Ladies F.C) is a women's association football club based in Lagos State. It is owned by the City of David parish of Redeemed Christian Church of God, a body that also governs the men's arm of the team, COD United F.C. They won the Lagos Women's FA cup in 2015 and represented the state at the national level. They presently compete in the Nigeria Women Premier League, the first in the COD United affiliated teams to gain promotion to an elite division.

The Amazons have contributed to the national team of Nigeria at international tournaments. Vivian Ikechukwu, Patience Dike, Nkechi Agamz and Grace Marcus have been part of the Under-17 squad of Nigeria at the World cup.

In February 2016, former Super Falcons captain and coach, Uche Eucharia was appointed head coach of the Amazons.

Current squad 
Squad list for 2016 season.

Management 
 Executive Director: Deji Tinubu
 Chief Executive: Shola Opaleye
 Manager: Ann Chiejine

Honours 
 2015 Lagos State Women's FA Cup winners

References

External links 
Official website

Women's football clubs in Nigeria
Association football clubs established in 2013